The 2014 Oakland mayoral election was held on November 4, 2014 to elect the mayor of Oakland, California. It saw the election of Libby Schaaf, who unseated incumbent mayor Jean Quan.

This was the first time since 1990 that an incumbent mayor of Oakland was defeated for reelection.

Municipal elections in California are officially non-partisan.

The election was held using instant-runoff voting

Background
Four years prior, Jean Quan had won what was regarded to have been a surprise victory. She won a narrow victory in the tenth, and final possible, round of the instant-runoff vote, despite runner-up Don Perata having led the vote count in all nine previous rounds.

Many challengers filed to unseat Quan in 2014, the best-known names being City Council members Rebecca Kaplan and Libby Schaaf; political science professor, former television commentator, and 2010 mayoral candidate Joe Tuman, City Auditor Courtney Ruby; former Port of Oakland Commissioner Bryan Parker; and civil rights lawyer Dan Siegel.

Candidates

Results

Results summary
The following table shows a summary of the instant runoff for the election. The table shows the round in which the candidate was defeated or elected the winner, the votes for the candidate in that round, and what share those votes were of all votes counting for any candidate in that round. There is also a bar graph showing those votes for each candidate and categorized as either first-round votes or votes that were transferred from another candidate.

Vote counts by round
The following table shows how votes were counted in a series of rounds of instant runoffs. Each voter could mark which candidates were the voter's first, second, and third choice. Each voter had one vote, but could mark three choices for how that vote can be counted. In each round, the vote is counted for the most preferred candidate that has not yet been eliminated. Then one or more candidates with the fewest votes are eliminated. Votes that counted for an eliminated candidate are transferred to the voter's next most preferred candidate that has not yet been eliminated.

Continuing votes are votes that counted for a candidate in that round. Exhausted ballots represent votes that could not be transferred because a less preferred candidate was not marked on the ballot. Voters were allowed to mark only three choices because of voting system limitations. Over votes are votes that could not be counted for a candidate because more than one candidate was marked for a choice that was ready to be counted. Under votes are ballots were left blank or that only marked a choice for a write-in candidate that had not qualified as a write-in candidate.

References

2014 California elections
2014
Oakland
2010s in Oakland, California